Benjamin Waisbren is an American film producer, who co-founded Virtual Studios in 1986, a studio that was a film financier, distribution and production company, he worked for the company until 2008, it was closed in 2009

Selected filmography

External links

References

Living people
American film producers
Year of birth missing (living people)